A Sentimental Education is a 2017 album of cover songs by Luna. It was their first release after their 2015 reunion.

Track listing
 "Fire in Cairo" (Michael Dempsey, Robert Smith, Lol Tolhurst) [originally by The Cure)
 "Gin" (Willie Alexander) (originally by Willie Alexander)
 "Friends" (Doug Yule) (originally by The Velvet Underground)
 "One Together" (Jeremy Spencer) (originally by Fleetwood Mac)
 "Most of the Time" (Bob Dylan) (originally by Bob Dylan)
 "Sweetness" (Jon Anderson, Clive Bailey, Chris Squire) (originally by Yes)
 "Letter to Hermione" (David Bowie) (originally by David Bowie)
 "(Walkin' Thru' the) Sleepy City" (Mick Jagger, Keith Richards) (originally by The Rolling Stones)
 "Let Me Dream If I Want To" (Willy DeVille) (originally by Mink DeVille)
 "Car Wash Hair" (Mercury Rev) (originally by Mercury Rev)

References

External links

2017 albums
Luna (1990s American band) albums
Covers albums